A truckle of cheese is a cylindrical wheel of cheese, usually taller than it is wide, and sometimes described as barrel-shaped. The word is derived from the Latin trochlea, 'wheel, pulley'. Truckles vary greatly in size, from the wax-coated cheeses sold in supermarkets, to 25-kilogram or larger artisanal cheeses.

References

Cheese